Rocco Arturo Spinola (27 October 1930 – 10 October 1998) was an Italian weightlifter. He competed in the men's bantamweight event at the 1960 Summer Olympics.

References

External links
 

1930 births
1998 deaths
Italian male weightlifters
Olympic weightlifters of Italy
Weightlifters at the 1960 Summer Olympics
Sportspeople from the Province of Lecce